This is a list of notable streets and squares in Dublin, Ireland.


References

Notes

Sources

External links
Streetnames of Dublin at Archiseek Architecture of Ireland
Sráidainmneacha Bhaile Átha Cliath — English-Irish list of Dublin street names at Leathanach baile Shéamais Uí Bhrógáin 
Dublin Streetnames in Irish — photographs of multiple or incorrect Irish translations of Dublin street names.
1610 Map of Dublin published by John Speed (Perry–Castañeda Library Map Collection)

 
 
Streets
Dublin
Streets